Guam Highway 3 (GH-3) is one of the primary automobile highways in the United States territory of Guam.

Route description
It runs in a south to north direction, from a junction with GH-1 near the Micronesia Mall in the southern community of Tamuning in a general northeasterly direction to the community of Dededo, where it meets GH-3A and GH-9. In between, it passes Naval Computer and Telecommunications Station Guam and the newly-established Marine Corps Base Camp Blaz.

Major intersections

Suffixed route

Guam Highway 3A (GH-3A) connects GH-3 and GH-9 to Ritidian Point at the northern tip of the island of Guam in Dededo. It is undergoing expansion to accommodate increased activity from the activation of Camp Blaz.

References

003